In comics, Rocky Davis may refer to the following characters:

Absorbing Man (Carl Creel) used the name during his boxing career
Rockwell Davis, cousin of Creel, was nicknamed Rocky Davis
Rocky Davis, a member of the Challengers of the Unknown